Peter Doyle may refer to:

Sportspeople
 Peter Doyle (cyclist) (born 1945), Irish Olympic cyclist
 Peter Doyle (footballer, born 1973), Australian footballer for Fitzroy
 Peter Doyle (footballer, born 1955), Australian footballer for Geelong
 Peter Doyle (soccer), Australian former international soccer player

Others
 Peter Hogarth Doyle (1925–2007), Royal Australian Navy admiral
 Peter Doyle (chemist) (1921–2004), British chemist
 Peter Doyle (singer) (1949–2001), Australian pop singer
 Peter Doyle (writer) (born 1951), Australian crime novelist and true crime writer
 Peter Doyle (politician) (1844–1900), eleventh Secretary of State of Wisconsin
 Peter Doyle (transit worker) (fl. 1866), Washington DC streetcar conductor and lover of Walt Whitman
 Peter Doyle (bishop) (born 1944), Roman Catholic Bishop of Northampton